"Carnaval" is a song by Colombian singer Maluma. The song is taken from the mixtape PB.DB The Mixtape. It was released as the mixtape's third single on 25 June 2014, by Sony Music Colombia. The song was commercially successful across countries in Latin America, reaching the top ten on the charts in Colombia and peaking at number 6 on the Billboard Mexican Airplay songs chart. It was later included on the track list of Maluma's second studio album Pretty Boy, Dirty Boy, and played as part of the One World: Together at Home concert.

Music video
The music video for "Carnaval" premiered on 30 January 2015 on Maluma's Vevo account on YouTube. It was filmed in Lancaster, California and features actress and model Alyssa Arce. The music video was directed by Carlos Perez and has surpassed over 230 million views on YouTube.

Charts

Certifications

References

External links

2014 singles
2014 songs
Maluma songs
Spanish-language songs
Soca songs
Vallenato songs
Sony Music Colombia singles
Sony Music Latin singles
Songs written by Maluma (singer)